Robert Michael Makeham (6 November 1901 – 3 February 1974) was an Australian rules footballer who played with Collingwood in the Victorian Football League (VFL).

After being part of losing Grand Finals in 1925 and 1926 he played in Collingwood premiership sides the next four seasons. A versatile player, Makeham played his early football as a centre-half forward and follower before settling into the half back and half forward flanks.

References

External links

1901 births
1974 deaths
Australian rules footballers from Victoria (Australia)
Australian Rules footballers: place kick exponents
Collingwood Football Club players
Collingwood Football Club Premiership players
Four-time VFL/AFL Premiership players